The 1971 Pan American Games, officially known as the VI Pan American Games, were a continental multi-sport event held in Cali, Colombia, from July 30 to August 13, 1971. At the Games, 2,935 athletes selected from 32 National Olympic Committees (NOCs) participated in events in 17 sports. Twenty nations earned medals during the competition, and fifteen won at least one gold medal.

Medal table 

The ranking in this table is based on medal counts published by several media organizations. By default, the table is ordered by the number of gold medals won by the athletes representing a nation. (In this context, a nation is an entity represented by a NOC). The number of silver medals is taken into consideration next and then the number of bronze medals. If nations are still tied, equal ranking is given and they are listed alphabetically by IOC country code.

Medal table

Notes 

  Some sources appoint that the United States achieved 74 silver medals and 39 bronze medals, while other reports count 73 and 40, respectively. This would result in the same total medal count for American athletes during the Games.
  Some reports say that Cuba earned 30 gold medals and 24 bronze medals, instead of 31 and 24, respectively. This would result in a total of 103 medals earned by Cuban athletes during the Games.
  Some sources appoint that Canada actually achieved 42 bronze medals, not 41. This would result in a total of 81 medals earned by Canadian athletes during the Games.

References 

General

 

Specific

See also 

Medal table
Pan American Games medal tables